Limbach is an Ortsgemeinde – a community belonging to a Verbandsgemeinde – in the Westerwaldkreis in Rhineland-Palatinate, Germany. The agriculturally structured residential community belongs to the Verbandsgemeinde of Hachenburg, a kind of collective municipality. Its seat is in the like-named town.

Geography

The state-recognized recreational resort (Erholungsort) lies in the Westerwald between Limburg and Siegen, on the Kleine Nister in the nature and landscape conservation area of the Kroppach Switzerland (Kroppacher Schweiz)

History
In 1346, Limbach had its first documentary mention in a donation document.

Politics

Municipal council
The municipal council is made up of 8 council members who were elected in a majority vote in a municipal election on 13 June 2004.

Town partnerships
Since 1998, a partnership has existed with the Hungarian community of Kács.

Regular events
The Brückenfest (“Bridge Festival”), held on the second Saturday in July, is the summer night event in the Kroppacher Schweiz region attracting some thousand visitors each year. It takes place on and around the local stone arch bridge from 1871.

Economy and infrastructure

South of the community runs Bundesstraße 414, leading from Hohenroth to Hachenburg. The nearest Autobahn interchanges are in Siegen, Wilnsdorf and Herborn on the A 45 (Dortmund–Gießen). The nearest interchanges on the A 3 (Cologne–Frankfurt) are in Montabaur und Mogendorf. The nearest InterCityExpress stop is the railway station at Montabaur on the Cologne-Frankfurt high-speed rail line.

References

External links
  Limbach
  Limbach in the collective municipality’s Web pages 

Municipalities in Rhineland-Palatinate
Westerwaldkreis
Kroppach Switzerland